Leroy Moss (born March 27, 1951) is a retired Canadian football player who played for the Edmonton Eskimos and BC Lions. He won the Grey Cup with Edmonton in 1975. He played college football at the University of Missouri from 1972 to 1973.

References

1951 births
Living people
Edmonton Elks players
American football running backs
Canadian football running backs
Missouri Tigers football players